Bastilla crameri is a moth of the family Noctuidae first described by Frederic Moore in 1885. It is found from the Indian subregion to Sri Lanka, Peninsular Malaysia, Japan, Sumatra and Borneo. It is also present in South Africa.

Description
Its wingspan is about 63 mm. It is similar to Bastilla analis, but differs in the postmedial line having the white band reduced to a line, and being slightly outlined with purplish grey from the angle to inner margin. Some specimens have the whole dark patch between the white band and the postmedial line suffused with purplish white.

The species' head is dark brownish red with white markings in larva. There is an oval or triangular yellow spot on each side of the vertical sinus. Body pale pinkish brown with darker suffusion. Ventral surface is pale with black and red. The larvae feed on Sandoricum and Phyllanthus species.

References

External links

Bastilla (moth)
Moths of Asia
Moths described in 1885